is a former Japanese football player. She played for Japan national team.

Club career
Yamagishi was born in Saitama Prefecture on 28 November 1979. After graduating from high school, she joined Prima Ham FC Kunoichi (later Iga FC Kunoichi) in 1998. She played 131 matches in L.League and she was selected Best Eleven 5 times (1999, 2001, 2002, 2003 and 2004). In 2007, she moved to INAC Leonessa. She retired end of 2008 season.

National team career
In December 1998, when Yamagishi was 19 years old, she was selected Japan national team for 1998 Asian Games. At this competition, on 8 December, she debuted against Thailand. She played at 1999, 2001, 2003 AFC Championship and 2002 Asian Games. She was also a member of Japan for 2003 World Cup and 2004 Summer Olympics. She played 60 games and scored 6 goals for Japan until 2005.

National team statistics

References

External links
 

1979 births
Living people
Association football people from Saitama Prefecture
Japanese women's footballers
Japan women's international footballers
Nadeshiko League players
Iga FC Kunoichi players
INAC Kobe Leonessa players
2003 FIFA Women's World Cup players
Olympic footballers of Japan
Footballers at the 2004 Summer Olympics
Asian Games medalists in football
Footballers at the 1998 Asian Games
Footballers at the 2002 Asian Games
Women's association football defenders
Asian Games bronze medalists for Japan
Medalists at the 1998 Asian Games
Medalists at the 2002 Asian Games